Sharon Prins (also known by her married name Sharon Boxem-Prins; born 24 August 1988) is a former Dutch darts player who played in events of the British Darts Organisation (BDO).

Career
Prins was born in 1988 in Zoetermeer and became a darts player in 2006. Her nickname is "Racing Angel" and follows from her passion for motorcycling. Prins plays darts since 2006. She managed to qualify for the BDO Women World Championship 2013, where she lost in the semi-final to Lisa Ashton.

Prins has won the Catalonia Open Darts in 2013, 2014, 2015, 2016, 2017, and 2018.

2020
Since the 2020 World Championship she has not participated in any darts event.

BDO World Championships results

BDO

 2013: Semi-final (lost to Lisa Ashton 0–2)
 2014: Quarter Final (lost to Irina Armstrong 1–2)
 2015: Semi-final (lost to Lisa Ashton 0–2)
 2017: Last 16 (lost to Lisa Ashton 0–2)
 2018: Quarter Final (lost to Deta Hedman 0–2)
 2019: Quarter Final (lost to Mikuru Suzuki 0–2)
 2020: Last 16 (lost to Anastasia Dobromyslova 0–2)

References

External links
Player profile

1988 births
Living people
British Darts Organisation players
Dutch darts players
People from 's-Gravenzande
Female darts players
Sportspeople from South Holland
21st-century Dutch women